Joseph Owens is the name of:

Joseph Owens (Jesuit), Caribbean social worker and author
Joseph Owens (Redemptorist) (1908–2005), Canadian scholar in medieval philosophy
Joe Owens (1946–2013), American football defensive end
 Joseph Owens (politician) (1912–1994), Mayor of Galway from 1953 to 1954
Joseph Owens (footballer) (1878–?), Rhosllanerchrugog F.C. and Wales international footballer